The 2017 season was the New Orleans Saints' 51st in the National Football League, their 42nd playing home games at the Mercedes-Benz Superdome and their 11th under head coach Sean Payton. The team improved on their 7–9 output from the previous season, while achieving an eight-game winning streak after losing their first two contests, their longest streak (tied with their 2011 team) since 2009, when they won Super Bowl XLIV. In Week 13 the Saints clinched their first winning season since 2013 and swept the Carolina Panthers for the first time since 2011. In Week 16, the Saints clinched a playoff spot for the first time since 2013 by defeating the Atlanta Falcons. In Week 17, the Saints clinched the NFC South for the first time since 2011 with the Panthers loss to the Falcons. This was the first of four consecutive NFC South titles for the Saints. On January 7, 2018 the Saints played their divisional rival Carolina Panthers in the playoffs for the first time in franchise history. They beat Carolina 31–26 in the Wild Card, but lost 29–24 to the Minnesota Vikings in the Divisional Round in a shocking ending.

This year was Tom Benson's final season as owner of the Saints, as he died at the age of 90 on March 15, 2018 from influenza.

Offseason

Signings

Releases

Draft

Staff

Final roster

Preseason
After three years of holding training camp at The Greenbrier resort in West Virginia, the Saints opted to move camp back to the team's headquarters facility in Metairie, Louisiana.

Regular season

Schedule
On December 13, 2016, the NFL announced that the Saints will play the Miami Dolphins as one of the  London Games at Wembley Stadium in London, England, with the Dolphins serving as the home team. The game will occur during Week 4 (Sunday, October 1), and will be televised in the United States. The network and time will be announced in conjunction with the release of the regular season schedule.

The Saints' 2017 schedule was revealed on April 20.

Note: Intra-division opponents are in bold text.

Game summaries

Week 1: at Minnesota Vikings
In a playoff preview between these 2 teams, the Saints lost to the Vikings by a score of 29-19. Despite having a 6-3 lead at one time, the Saints were outscored 26-16 for the remainder of the game. With the loss, the Saints began the season 0-1 for the 4th straight season. It was also running back Adrian Peterson's first time playing in Minneapolis since leaving the Vikings via free agency in the offseason.

Week 2: vs. New England Patriots
The Saints lose to the defending Super Bowl champions, New England Patriots, thus dropping their record to 0-2.

Week 3: at Carolina Panthers
The Saints gain their first victory of the season against the Carolina Panthers. They improve to 1-2.

Week 4: at Miami Dolphins
NFL London Games
Hoping to improve their record to 2-2, the Saints flew to London to take on the Miami Dolphins. With the shutout victory, the Saints improved their season record in the process.

Week 6: vs. Detroit Lions
Coming off with the perfect win over Miami, the Saints host the Lions at home in the Superdome. Cameron Jordan gained popularity for his "spider" tackle, as well as a pick six in the end zone. The Saints would beat the Lions for the first time since the 2011 season, and then improve their record to 3-2.

Week 7: at Green Bay Packers

Week 8: vs. Chicago Bears

Week 9: vs. Tampa Bay Buccaneers

Week 10: at Buffalo Bills

Week 11: vs. Washington Redskins
 This would be the last time the team allowed a 100-yard rusher until December 13, 2020. This is also the first time since the 2009 season for the Saints to beat the Redskins and the first season to beat Kirk Cousins.

Week 12: at Los Angeles Rams
The Saints weren't able to beat the Rams, thus dropping to 8-3.

Week 13: vs. Carolina Panthers

The Saints clinched a winning record for the first time since 2013 and swept the Carolina Panthers for the first time since the Saints' 2011 Season. This improved their record to 9-3.

Week 14: at Atlanta Falcons
After a costly Unsportsmanlike Conduct penalty committed by Sean Payton, the Saints were defeated by the Falcons. They fell to 9-4.

Week 15: vs. New York Jets
The Saints beat the Jets for the first time since the 2009 Season, improving their record to 10-4.

Week 16: vs. Atlanta Falcons
The Saints meet the Falcons again, but this time, they beat them by 10 points. This also brought their record up to 11-4.

Week 17: at Tampa Bay Buccaneers
The Saints meet the Buccaneers on the road. However, Jameis Winston would win this game. The Saints finish their regular season 11-5 and advance to the Wild Card playoff game.

Standings

Division

Conference

Postseason

NFC Wild Card Playoffs: vs. (5) Carolina Panthers
The Saints meet the Panthers in the Playoffs for the first time. It also marked their first Wild Card victory against their division rival by five points. With their victory over the Panthers, the Saints extend their season by improving to 12-5 and advancing to the Divisional Playoff game.

NFC Divisional Playoffs: at (2) Minnesota Vikings

References

External links
 2017 New Orleans Saints at Pro-Football-Reference.com

New Orleans
New Orleans Saints seasons
New Orleans Saints
NFC South championship seasons